X10 is a series of two-car electric multiple units which was formerly operated by Greater Stockholm Transport (SL) on the Stockholm commuter rail between 1983 and 2017, when the City Line project made them imcompatible with the X60 train sets. The X10 was operated in sets of up to five units, making ten-car trains, each unit consisting of one motor car and one unpowered car. They were completely compatible with the X1 introduced in the 1960s. 101 units were built by ASEA between 1982 and 1993.

Between 1993 and 1999, 49 X10 units were rebuilt to X11 for the Skåne Commuter Rail and the Gothenburg Commuter Rail. They have a different interior more suitable for regional traffic and are slightly heavier and have toilets (X10 don't have them since most SL stations have toilets). From 1999 only 52 X10 remained and all of them belonged to Storstockholms Lokaltrafik (SL). They were refurbished with new interiors and repainted between 1998 and 2002

Two other variants are X12 and X14 which can reach a top speed of 160 km/h. The X12 has a 1st class section while X11 and X14 only has 2nd class. 18 X12 were built and 18 X14 plus two that have been rebuilt from X12 to X14. They have been used for various regional traffic in southern Sweden.

During the early 1990s, the Norwegian State Railways borrowed X10 units during the summer to operate on the Flåm Line. This was in part because they wanted to use the X10's larger windows for the tourist route.

In 2017, 43 of the 52 X10 units were transported to Hallstahammar to be scrapped. They could no longer be used in Stockholm anymore because of platform screen doors installed on the Citybanan demanding all trains to have doors placed like the X60. Only 9 of them were sold (4 to TÅGAB, 4 to Saga Rail and 1 to Transitio mainly as a source for spare parts), because their age and the lack of toilets made them unattractive on other routes. The 8 remaining units owned by TÅGAB and Saga Rail received another minor refurbishment, including exterior repainting and the installation of on-board toilets, and since early-2018 are used on the routes Gothenburg–Falun and Stockholm–Linköping.

Gallery

References
Bibliography

Notes

External links
 
 Järnväg.net on X10 
 Swetramway on X10 

ASEA multiple units
ABB multiple units
X10
Rail transport in Stockholm
Train-related introductions in 1983